The Ngao River is a river of Thailand with its source in the Phi Pan Nam Range. It is a tributary of the Yom River, part of the Chao Phraya River basin.

This river should not be confused with the Ngao River that is a tributary of the Yuam River (แม่น้ำยวม), part of the Salween basin, located to the west.

See also
Tributaries of the Chao Phraya River

References

Rivers of Thailand